This is a list of flag bearers who have represented Austria at the Olympics.

Flag bearers carry the national flag of their country at the opening ceremony of the Olympic Games.

See also
Austria at the Olympics

References

Austria at the Olympics
Austria
Olympic